Kotrba (Czech feminine: Kotrbová) is a Czech surname. Notable people with the surname include:

 Emil Kotrba (1912–1983), Czech painter
 Jiří Kotrba (born 1958), Czech football manager and player

See also
 

Czech-language surnames